Robin L. Rasor a.k.a. Ruth Rasor (b. 1956) is a technology transfer professional with an MS in genetics who serves as the Executive director of the Duke University Licensing & Ventures office.

Background and career 
Rasor received her BS in bacteriology from Ohio Wesleyan University and her MS in genetics from Ohio State University.  She worked at Battelle Memorial Institute and in various roles in technology licensing at the University of Michigan, rising to become its Managing Director by 2014. In 2016, she was named to head the Duke University Office of Licensing and Ventures.

Senate testimony 
On April 3, 2019, Rasor and three other female inventors testified before Chairman Thom Tillis and the United States Senate subcommittee on intellectual property on "lost" female inventors and scientific trailblazers. Her testimony pointed out the gender disparities in the Patent process, and suggested solutions including academic, nonprofit, and government interventions to address this problem. Rasor also proposed that a high percentage of female inventors in Duke's leadership structure led to a culture of innovation at the school.

Awards and honors 

 President of the Association of University Technology Managers, 2011-2013
 Co-recipient of AACR Awards Team Award, 2007
 President's Award for Service to AUTM, 2005

References 

1956 births
Living people
Technology transfer
Licensing
Ohio State University alumni
Women biologists
Women inventors